Cottman may refer to:
 Joseph Stewart Cottman (1803–1863), American politician
 Cottman Transmission, American company
 Cottman's Star, fictional red giant